Charles B. Clarke may refer to:

Charles Baron Clarke (1832–1906), British botanist
Charles Bailey Clarke (1875–1944), mayor of Portland, Maine, 1918–1921
Charles B. Clarke (1836–1899), designer of the Fagin Building, buried at Bellefontaine Cemetery in St. Louis, Missouri

See also
Charles Barnett-Clarke, Dean of Cape Town, successor to Henry Alexander Douglas
Charles Clarke (disambiguation)